Evil Twin Brewing is a gypsy brewery originating in Denmark. Founded in 2010 by Jeppe Jarnit-Bjergsø. Evil Twin Brewing started as a gypsy brewery, in that the company does not operate an official brewery and, instead, collaborates with other brewers to produce their limited-edition and one-off beers as well as a series of seasonal and year-round beers available internationally. In January 2019 Evil Twin Brewing opened their first brick and mortar brewery in Ridgewood, Queens, New York City.
A tap room opened at the same location on October 2, 2019.

Jarnit-Bjergsø, a former schoolteacher in Copenhagen, is also the proprietor of the Ølbutikken bottle shop in Copenhagen, which imports and distributes craft beer throughout Europe, and a bar in Brooklyn called Tørst which serves Evil Twin and other craft beers. He is also the co-author of a book titled "Food & Beer" with chef Daniel Burns, who runs a Michelin-starred restaurant called Luksus that shares space with Tørst.

References

Breweries in Denmark
Companies based in Brooklyn
Danish companies established in 2010
Food and drink companies established in 2010
Beer brewing companies based in New York City